Melaleuca densa is a shrub in the myrtle family, Myrtaceae and is endemic to the south-west of Western Australia. It is a bushy shrub with profuse cream, yellow or greenish flowers and overlapping leaves on the youngest shoots.

Description 

The yellow or cream coloured flowers are in heads or spikes at the ends of branches that continue to grow after flowering. At the base of each flower there are brown, papery, overlapping bracts which fall off as the flowers develop. The stamens are arranged in 5 bundles around the flower, each bundle containing 3 to 6 stamens. Flowering occurs from August to September but sometimes continues to December.

Taxonomy and naming
This species was first formally described in 1812 by Robert Brown in Hortus Kewensis. The reason Brown chose the specific epithet (densa) is not known but it is from the Latin densus, meaning "dense", and may refer to the density of the leaves or of the flowers in the inflorescence.

Distribution and habitat
Melaleuca densa occurs from the Stirling Range to Augusta in the 
Avon Wheatbelt, Esperance Plains, Jarrah Forest, Mallee, Swan Coastal Plain and Warren biogeographic regions. It grows sandy or clayey soils in seasonally wet flats, in swamps and on riverbanks.

Conservation status
Melaleuca densa is listed as "not threatened" by the Government of Western Australia Department of Parks and Wildlife.

Gallery

References

densa
Myrtales of Australia
Rosids of Western Australia
Plants described in 1812
Endemic flora of Western Australia